Goran Brajković (18 July 1978 – 28 June 2015) was a Croatian footballer.

Club career
Brajković started off his career at HNK Rijeka in 1998 and played for several clubs in different countries. The midfielder last played for Opatija in Croatian Third Football League and was loaned out to an Austrian amateur side in 2011.

International career
He made his debut for Croatia in a March 2001 friendly match away against South Korea and earned his second and final cap three days later against the same opposition.

Personal life

Death
He died on 28 June 2015 in a motorcycle accident in Matulji.

Honours

Flamurtari Vlorë
Albanian Cup: 2009

Career statistics

References

External links

1978 births
2015 deaths
Footballers from Rijeka
Association football midfielders
Croatian footballers
Croatia youth international footballers
Croatia under-21 international footballers
Croatia international footballers
HNK Rijeka players
FC Arsenal Kyiv players
NK Pomorac 1921 players
NK Bela Krajina players
Handknattleiksfélag Kópavogs players
Flamurtari Vlorë players
Kastoria F.C. players
NK Opatija players
Croatian Football League players
Ukrainian First League players
Ukrainian Premier League players
First Football League (Croatia) players
Slovenian PrvaLiga players
Úrvalsdeild karla (football) players
Kategoria Superiore players
Football League (Greece) players
Second Football League (Croatia) players
Croatian expatriate footballers
Expatriate footballers in Ukraine
Croatian expatriate sportspeople in Ukraine
Expatriate footballers in Slovenia
Croatian expatriate sportspeople in Slovenia
Expatriate footballers in Iceland
Croatian expatriate sportspeople in Iceland
Expatriate footballers in Albania
Croatian expatriate sportspeople in Albania
Expatriate footballers in Greece
Croatian expatriate sportspeople in Greece
Expatriate footballers in Austria
Croatian expatriate sportspeople in Austria
Road incident deaths in Croatia
Motorcycle road incident deaths